Die Orchidee is a German journal about orchidology.

References 

Publications about orchids
German-language journals
Bimonthly journals